Dudchenko is a surname of Ukrainian origin. Notable people with the surname include:

 Alexei Dudchenko (born 1984), Russian acrobatic gymnast
 Anton Dudchenko (born 1996), Ukrainian biathlete
 Inga Dudchenko (born 1988), Kazakhstani rower
 Kostyantyn Dudchenko (born 1986), Ukrainian footballer
 Olga Dudchenko (born 1987), Kazakhstani biathlete

See also
 

Ukrainian-language surnames